Sad Eyes may refer to:
 Sad Eyes (Robert John song)
 Sad Eyes (Bruce Springsteen song)
 Sad Eyes (Andy Williams song)
 Sad Eyes, a song by Crystal Castles from the album III
 Sad Eyes, a song by James Arthur from the album You